Regent railway station is located on the Mernda line in Victoria, Australia. It serves the northern Melbourne suburb of Reservoir, and it opened on 8 October 1889 as Preston-Regent Street. It was renamed Regent on 1 August 1905.

History

Named after the locality and nearby Regent Street, Regent station opened on 8 October 1889, when the Inner Circle line was extended from North Fitzroy to Reservoir.

In 1967, boom barriers replaced hand gates at the Regent Street level crossing, located nearby in the Up direction of the station. In 1970, the present station buildings were provided.

Platforms and services

Regent has two side platforms. It is serviced by Metro Trains' Mernda line services.

Platform 1:
  all stations and limited express services to Flinders Street

Platform 2:
  all stations services to Mernda

Transport links

Dysons operates three routes via Regent station, under contract to Public Transport Victoria:
 : North East Reservoir – Northcote Plaza
 : Preston – West Preston
 : to Northcote

References

External links
 Melway map at street-directory.com.au

Railway stations in Melbourne
Railway stations in Australia opened in 1889
Railway stations in the City of Darebin